The 1975 Ukrainian Cup was the 23rd edition of the Ukrainian SSR football knockout competition, known as the Ukrainian Cup. The competition started on May 10, and its final took place on November 9, 1975.

The last year cup holder SC Tavriya Simferopol was defeated in the finals by FC Zirka Kirovohrad.

This year involved participation of four teams out of the Soviet First League as well. They entered the competition at quarterfinals.

Teams

Tournament distribution
The competition was conducted among all 16 Ukrainian clubs of the 1975 Soviet Second League, Zone 6 and all 4 Ukrainian clubs of the 1975 Soviet First League.

Other professional teams
The six Ukrainian professional teams in the Soviet Top League did not take part in the competition.
 1975 Soviet Top League (6): FC Chornomorets Odesa, FC Dnipro Dnipropetrovsk, FC Dynamo Kyiv, FC Karpaty Lviv, FC Shakhtar Donetsk, FC Zorya Voroshylovhrad

Competition schedule

First round (1/16)
The first legs were played on 10 June, and the second legs were played on 25 June 1975.

|}

Second round
The first legs were played on 9 July, and the second legs were played on 24 July 1975.

|}

Quarterfinals
The first legs were played on 1 August, and the second legs were played on 22 August 1975. Also, four clubs of the Soviet First League entered the competition FC Spartak Ivano-Frankivsk, SC Tavriya Simferopol, FC Metalist Kharkiv, FC Metalurh Zaporizhia.

|}

Semifinals
The first legs were played on 12 September, and the second legs were played on 13 October 1975.

|}

Final

The first leg was played on 4 November, and the second leg was played on 9 November 1975.

|}

First leg

Second leg

Zirka won 3–2 on aggregate

References

External links
 1975 Cup of the Ukrainian SSR
 Cup holders of the Ukrainian SSR

Football Cup of the Ukrainian SSR
1975 in Ukrainian football
1975 domestic association football cups